The Protocol to Prevent, Suppress and Punish Trafficking in Persons, Especially Women and Children (also referred to as the Trafficking Protocol or UN TIP Protocol) is a protocol to the United Nations Convention Against Transnational Organized Crime. It is one of the three Palermo protocols, the others being the Protocol Against the Smuggling of Migrants by Land, Sea and Air and the Protocol Against the Illicit Manufacturing of and Trafficking in Firearms.

The protocol was adopted by the United Nations General Assembly in 2000 and entered into force on 25 December 2003. As of November 2022, it has been ratified by 180 parties.

The United Nations Office on Drugs and Crime (UNODC) is responsible for implementing the protocol. It offers practical help to states with drafting laws, creating comprehensive national anti-trafficking strategies, and assisting with resources to implement them. In March 2009, UNODC launched the Blue Heart Campaign to fight human trafficking, to raise awareness, and to encourage involvement and inspire action.

The protocol commits ratifying states to prevent and combat trafficking in persons, protecting and assisting victims of trafficking and promoting cooperation among states in order to meet those objectives.

Content of the protocol 
The protocol covers the following:

Defining the crime of trafficking in human beings; To be considered trafficking in persons, a situation must meet three conditions: act (i.e., recruitment), means (i.e., through the use of force or deception) and purpose (i.e., for the purpose of forced labour)

"Trafficking in persons" shall mean the recruitment, transportation, transfer, harbouring or receipt of persons, by means of the threat or use of force or other forms of coercion, of abduction, of fraud, of deception, of the abuse of power or of a position of vulnerability or of the giving or receiving of payments or benefits to achieve the consent of a person having control over another person, for the purpose of exploitation. Exploitation shall include, at a minimum, the exploitation of the prostitution of others or other forms of sexual exploitation, forced labour or services, slavery or practices similar to slavery, servitude or the removal of organs... The consent of a victim of trafficking in persons to the intended exploitation set forth [above] shall be irrelevant where any of the means set forth [above] have been used.

Facilitating the return and acceptance of children who have been victims of cross-border trafficking, with due regard to their safety
Prohibiting the trafficking of children (which is defined as being a person under 18 years of age) for purposes of commercial sexual exploitation of children (CSEC), exploitative labour practices, or the removal of body parts
Suspending parental rights of parents, caregivers, or any other persons who have parental rights in respect of a child should they be found to have trafficked a child
Ensuring that definitions of trafficking reflect the need for special safeguards and care for children, including appropriate legal protection
Ensuring that trafficked persons are not punished for any offences or activities related to their having been trafficked, such as prostitution and immigration violations
Ensuring that victims of trafficking are protected from deportation or return where there are reasonable grounds to suspect that such return would represent a significant security risk to the trafficked person or their family
Considering temporary or permanent residence in countries of transit or destination for trafficking victims in exchange for testimony against alleged traffickers, or on humanitarian and compassionate grounds
Providing for proportional criminal penalties to be applied to persons found guilty of trafficking in aggravating circumstances, including offences involving trafficking in children or offences committed or involving complicity by state officials
Providing for the confiscation of the instruments and proceeds of trafficking and related offences to be used for the benefit of trafficked persons

The convention and the protocol obligate ratifying states to introduce national trafficking legislation.

Regional action against trafficking in human beings
In Warsaw on 16 May 2005, the Council of Europe Convention on Action against Trafficking in Human Beings was opened for accession. The convention established a Group of Experts on Action against Trafficking in Human Beings (GRETA) which monitors the implementation of the convention through country reports. It has been ratified (as of January 2016) by 45 European states, while a further one state (Turkey) has signed but not yet ratified it.

Complementary protection is ensured through the Council of Europe Convention on the Protection of Children against Sexual Exploitation and Sexual Abuse (Lanzarote, 25 Oct 2007).

In addition, the European Court of Human Rights of the Council of Europe in Strasbourg has passed judgments involving trafficking in human beings which violated obligations under the European Convention on Human Rights: Siliadin v France, judgment of 26 July 2005, and Rantsev v Cyprus and Russia, judgment of 7 January 2010.

The Council of Europe co-operates closely with the United Nations.

See also
Child laundering
Child harvesting
Convention for the Suppression of the Traffic in Persons and of the Exploitation of the Prostitution of Others
International Convention for the Suppression of the Traffic in Women and Children
List of international adoption scandals

References

External links
UNODC site
Wording of protocol
Ratifications TIP Protocol – UN Treaty Collection
Travaux Préparatoires of the negotiations for the elaboration of the United Nations Convention against Organized Crime and the Protocols thereto
GRETA action by the Council of Europe
Warsaw Convention on Action against Trafficking in Human Beings
Lanzarote Convention on the Protection of Children against Sexual Exploitation and Sexual Abuse

Protocol to Prevent, Suppress and Punish Trafficking in Persons, especially Women and Children
United Nations treaties
Treaties concluded in 2000
Child labour treaties
Treaties entered into force in 2003
Treaties of Afghanistan
Treaties of Albania
Treaties of Algeria
Treaties of Angola
Treaties of Antigua and Barbuda
Treaties of Argentina
Treaties of Armenia
Treaties of Australia
Treaties of Austria
Treaties of Azerbaijan
Treaties of the Bahamas
Treaties of Bahrain
Treaties of Bangladesh
Treaties of Belarus
Treaties of Barbados
Treaties of Belgium
Treaties of Belize
Treaties of Benin
Treaties of Bolivia
Treaties of Bosnia and Herzegovina
Treaties of Botswana
Treaties of Brazil
Treaties of Brunei
Treaties of Bulgaria
Treaties of Burkina Faso
Treaties of Burundi
Treaties of Cambodia
Treaties of Cameroon
Treaties of Canada
Treaties of Cape Verde
Treaties of the Central African Republic
Treaties of Chad
Treaties of Chile
Treaties of the People's Republic of China
Treaties of Colombia
Treaties of Costa Rica
Treaties of Ivory Coast
Treaties of Croatia
Treaties of Cuba
Treaties of Cyprus
Treaties of the Czech Republic
Treaties of the Democratic Republic of the Congo
Treaties of Denmark
Treaties of Djibouti
Treaties of Dominica
Treaties of the Dominican Republic
Treaties of Ecuador
Treaties of Egypt
Treaties of El Salvador
Treaties of Equatorial Guinea
Treaties of Eritrea
Treaties of Estonia
Treaties of Ethiopia
Treaties entered into by the European Union
Treaties of Fiji
Treaties of Finland
Treaties of France
Treaties of Gabon
Treaties of the Gambia
Treaties of Georgia (country)
Treaties of Germany
Treaties of Ghana
Treaties of Greece
Treaties of Grenada
Treaties of Guatemala
Treaties of Guinea
Treaties of Guinea-Bissau
Treaties of Guyana
Treaties of Haiti
Treaties of Honduras
Treaties of Hungary
Treaties of Iceland
Treaties of India
Treaties of Indonesia
Treaties of Ireland
Treaties of Israel
Treaties of Italy
Treaties of Jamaica
Treaties of Japan
Treaties of Jordan
Treaties of Kazakhstan
Treaties of Kenya
Treaties of Kiribati
Treaties of Kuwait
Treaties of Kyrgyzstan
Treaties of Laos
Treaties of Latvia
Treaties of Lebanon
Treaties of Lesotho
Treaties of Liberia
Treaties of the Libyan Arab Jamahiriya
Treaties of Liechtenstein
Treaties of Lithuania
Treaties of Luxembourg
Treaties of Madagascar
Treaties of Malawi
Treaties of Malaysia
Treaties of the Maldives
Treaties of Mali
Treaties of Malta
Treaties of Mauritania
Treaties of Mauritius
Treaties of Mexico
Treaties of the Federated States of Micronesia
Treaties of Monaco
Treaties of Mongolia
Treaties of Montenegro
Treaties of Morocco
Treaties of Mozambique
Treaties of Myanmar
Treaties of Namibia
Treaties of Nauru
Treaties of the Netherlands
Treaties of New Zealand
Treaties of Nicaragua
Treaties of Niger
Treaties of Nigeria
Treaties of Norway
Treaties of Oman
Treaties of Pakistan
Treaties of Palau
Treaties of the State of Palestine
Treaties of Panama
Treaties of Paraguay
Treaties of Peru
Treaties of the Philippines
Treaties of Poland
Treaties of Portugal
Treaties of Qatar
Treaties of Moldova
Treaties of Romania
Treaties of Russia
Treaties of Rwanda
Treaties of San Marino
Treaties of São Tomé and Príncipe
Treaties of Saudi Arabia
Treaties of Senegal
Treaties of Serbia and Montenegro
Treaties of Seychelles
Treaties of Sierra Leone
Treaties of Slovakia
Treaties of Slovenia
Treaties of South Africa
Treaties of Spain
Treaties of Sri Lanka
Treaties of Saint Kitts and Nevis
Treaties of Saint Lucia
Treaties of Saint Vincent and the Grenadines
Treaties of Singapore
Treaties of South Korea
Treaties of Sudan
Treaties of Suriname
Treaties of Eswatini
Treaties of Sweden
Treaties of Switzerland
Treaties of Syria
Treaties of Tajikistan
Treaties of Thailand
Treaties of North Macedonia
Treaties of East Timor
Treaties of Togo
Treaties of Trinidad and Tobago
Treaties of Tunisia
Treaties of Turkey
Treaties of Turkmenistan
Treaties of Ukraine
Treaties of the United Arab Emirates
Treaties of the United Kingdom
Treaties of Tanzania
Treaties of the United States
Treaties of Uruguay
Treaties of Uzbekistan
Treaties of Venezuela
Treaties of Vietnam
Treaties of Zambia
Treaties of Zimbabwe
International criminal law treaties
Children's rights treaties
2000 in New York City
Human trafficking treaties
Treaties adopted by United Nations General Assembly resolutions
Treaties extended to Aruba
Treaties extended to the Caribbean Netherlands
Treaties extended to Macau